Kelly Ann McGillis (born July 9, 1957) is an American actress. She is known for her film roles such as Rachel Lapp in Witness (1985), for which she received Golden Globe and BAFTA nominations; Charlie in Top Gun (1986); Made in Heaven (1987); The House on Carroll Street (1988); and as Kathryn Murphy in The Accused (1988). In her later career, she has starred in horror films such as Stake Land (2010), The Innkeepers (2011), and We Are What We Are (2013).

Early life 
McGillis was born on July 9, 1957, in the southern California suburb of Newport Beach, the eldest of three daughters born to Virginia Joan (née Snell), a homemaker, and Donald Manson McGillis, a physician. Her paternal ancestry is Scots-Irish, and her maternal ancestry is German; she also has Welsh ancestry. She attended Newport Harbor High School.

McGillis was raised in Los Angeles, and attended the Pacific Conservatory of the Performing Arts at Allan Hancock College in Santa Maria, California. After getting her GED after dropping out of high school in 1975, she moved to New York City to study acting at the Juilliard School, where she graduated in 1983, Group 12.

Career

Film 
After making her film debut in Reuben, Reuben in 1983, McGillis' breakout role was that of an Amish mother in Witness (1985) for which she received Golden Globe and BAFTA award nominations. Her next high-profile role was that of flight instructor Charlotte Blackwood (call sign "Charlie") in the 1986 fighter-pilot film Top Gun.

In 1987, McGillis acted in the romance film Made in Heaven, directed by Alan Rudolph, which was produced by Lorimar Productions.

McGillis played the part of caretaker for Miss Venable (Jessica Tandy) in 1988's The House on Carroll Street, which also starred Jeff Daniels. She overhears a suspicious conversation in the house next door and suspects that she's stumbled on a conspiracy to smuggle Nazi war criminals into the United States.

After 1988's The Accused, she appeared in Cat Chaser with Peter Weller, a film she despised and which discouraged her from pursuing an acting career. McGillis appeared in dozens of television and film roles throughout the 1990s before taking a break from acting for a few years.

McGillis played the part of Babe Ruth's second wife, Claire Merritt Ruth, in The Babe (1992).  From the late-1980s to the mid-1990s, McGillis appeared in Winter People (1989), and North (1994), her second Amish part in television or film, as well as several made-for-TV films.

In 1999, McGillis co-starred with Val Kilmer (who plays Virgil, a blind man), for a second time as his over protective sister in At First Sight.

She played the suspect in the disappearance of a young woman in The Monkey's Mask, an international lesbian cult film from 2000 starring Susie Porter. The film is based on the verse novel of the same name by Australian poet Dorothy Porter.

Television 

McGillis' early television roles included a part on the daytime soap One Life to Live in 1984.

She starred in the 1984 television movie Sweet Revenge (also known as Bittersweet Revenge) with Alec Baldwin.

Other television films during the 1980s included Private Sessions in 1985, and as a narrator in Santabear's First Christmas. She also narrated the documentary Out of Ireland for PBS in 1995.

Stage 

While at Juilliard she performed in William Congreve's Love for Love, directed by John Bletchley.  She appeared in a couple of off-broadway and Broadway theater productions during the 1980s in New York City.

During the late-1980s and through the mid-2000s, McGillis was a featured actress at the prestigious Shakespeare Theatre Company in Washington DC.  In 2002, she appeared in production of John Webber's play "The Duchess of Malfi" at the Shakespeare Theatre, Washington, DC.

In 2004, she appeared in the stage play The Graduate as Mrs. Robinson, touring the United States.  McGillis starred in a Pasadena Playhouse stage production of The Little Foxes by Lillian Hellman in May 2009, co-starring with Julia Duffy.

Her stage work includes: Don Juan (1982), The Sea Gull (1985), Peccadillo (1985), The Merchant of Venice (1988), Twelfth Night (1989), Mary Stuart (1990), The Merry Wives of Windsor (1990), Hedda Gabler (1994), Mourning Becomes Electra (1997), A Midsummer Night's Dream (1999), Measure for Measure (1999) and The Graduate (2004), together with additional roles in Love for Love, Six Characters in Search of an Author, Three Sisters and The Winter's Tale.

She also appeared in a production of Frankie and Johnny in the Clair de Lune by Terrence McNally, which toured the United Kingdom in 2010.

Return to film and TV 
She began working in television again in 2006, then in 2007 joined the cast of Showtime's The L Word for its fifth season.

She had a role in the 2010 vampire film Stake Land, directed by Jim Mickle, starring alongside Nick Damici, Connor Paolo and Danielle Harris.

McGillis was featured in a breast cancer docu-drama titled 1 a Minute, released in 2010.

She starred in Ti West's 2011 thriller The Innkeepers, We Are What We Are and Tio Papi in 2013, Grand Street, Love Finds You in Sugarcreek, Ohio (which was McGillis' third Amish-themed film), Z Nation, and an episode of Sisters of Mercy in 2014, and Blue in 2015.

An Uncommon Grace on Hallmark Channel was McGillis' fourth  Amish themed film. and she had the lead role in Mother of All Secrets (filmed in Bermuda) in 2017 as Rose Lewis.

Personal life
McGillis married fellow Juilliard student Boyd Black in 1979; the couple divorced in 1981. She married Fred Tillman in 1989, and they have two daughters. The couple divorced in 2002.

"The Centurion", a 110-foot schooner valued at $1.5 million owned by McGillis and her then-husband, Fred Tillman, was destroyed by fire in April 1996 at a marina in Dania, Florida. The fire started on an adjacent boat at the Port LauDania marina on a Dania Cutoff Canal and spread to the schooner. Tillman had brought the boat from the couple's home in Key West in hopes of selling it at the Fort Lauderdale Boat Show.

McGillis came out as a lesbian in 2009 during an interview with SheWired. In 2010, she entered into a civil union with Melanie Leis, a Philadelphia sales executive. They had met in 2000 when Leis was a bartender at the Caribbean Bar Grill & Brewery in Key West, Florida, which McGillis owned with her then-husband. Their union was dissolved the following year.

McGillis worked full-time with drug addicts and alcoholics at Seabrook House Drug Alcohol Rehab Center, a rehabilitation center in Bridgeton, New Jersey, when she and Leis shared a home in Collingswood.

McGillis currently lives in Hendersonville, North Carolina. As of 2013, she has taught acting at the New York Studio for Stage and Screen (NYS3) in Asheville, North Carolina.

2016 home invasion
McGillis was left scratched and bruised after being assaulted by a woman who broke into her home on June 17, 2016. She said the attack, as well as others she has experienced in the past, led her to apply for a concealed carry permit to protect herself. Following the incident, a 38-year-old woman, Laurence Marie Dorn, was charged with second-degree burglary, misdemeanor larceny, misdemeanor stalking, assault and battery, and interfering with emergency communication. Dorn was later convicted of misdemeanor breaking and entering and sentenced to probation.

Filmography

Film

Television

Awards and nominations

References

External links 

Kelly McGillis on IBDB (Internet Broadway Database)

1957 births
Living people
20th-century American actresses
21st-century American actresses
Actresses from Los Angeles
Allan Hancock College alumni
American film actresses
American people of German descent
American people of Scotch-Irish descent
American people of Welsh descent
American Shakespearean actresses
American soap opera actresses
American stage actresses
American television actresses
American voice actresses
Juilliard School alumni
American lesbian actresses
LGBT people from California
Newport Harbor High School alumni
People from Collingswood, New Jersey